David Austin Tapp (born 1962) is a judge of the United States Court of Federal Claims and a former circuit court judge from Kentucky.

Education 

Tapp received his Bachelor of Arts from Morehead State University, his Master of Science from the Chaminade University of Honolulu, and his Juris Doctor from the University of Louisville School of Law.

Campaign for Kentucky Supreme Court 

In 2017, he announced that he would run in 2018 for Justice Daniel J. Venters' seat on the Kentucky Supreme Court representing the 3rd Supreme Court district. Veters, whose term ended on January 6, 2019, announced in 2017 that he would not seek reelection. Tapp was defeated in the nonpartisan primary.

Federal judicial service 

On March 1, 2019, President Donald Trump announced his intent to nominate Tapp to a seat on the United States Court of Federal Claims. On March 5, 2019, his nomination was sent to the Senate. President Trump nominated Tapp to the seat vacated by Judge Lynn J. Bush, who assumed senior status on October 22, 2013. On May 22, 2019, a hearing on his nomination was held before the Senate Judiciary Committee. On June 20, 2019, his nomination was reported out of committee by a 18–4 vote. On November 5, 2019, the Senate invoked cloture on his nomination by a 83–9 vote. He was confirmed later that day by a 85–8 vote. He received his judicial commission on November 19, 2019,
and took the oath of office on November 22, 2019.

References

External links 
 
 

1962 births
Living people
20th-century American lawyers
21st-century American lawyers
21st-century American judges
Chaminade University of Honolulu alumni
Circuit court judges in the United States
Judges of the United States Court of Federal Claims
Kentucky lawyers
Kentucky state court judges
Morehead State University alumni
People from Lexington, Kentucky
United States Article I federal judges appointed by Donald Trump
University of Louisville School of Law alumni